Peter Kurze is a German publisher and author. He became known through his book series on the history of the automobile.

Life 
Born 1955 in Bremen, after two one-year internships at a machine factory and a bank, he studied mechanical engineering and later business administration with a focus on marketing and corporate history. In 1980 he started his own business with a company for vintage car spare parts and literature. In 1987, Short wrote his first book. It was about the VW-Kübelwagen type 181 bucket. At the end of the 80s he was one of the founders of the GummikuH motorcycling magazine.

In 1995, the Bremen acquired the image archive, consisting of positives, negatives and rights of use, the photographer Gerhard Schammelt, mainly Lloyd-,  Mercedes-Benz- and Volkswagen vehicles mapped. This base of nearly 12,000 images has been expanded by the purchase of other archives. Thus, Kurze was able to get the discounts and rights of the photographers Paul Botzenhardt (German and French automobiles), Rudolf Dodenhoff (various brands), Heinz Lutz (GDR vehicles), Walter Richleske (Borgward), Hans Saebens (various brands), Karl-Heinz Witte (Lloyd and Goliath) and Hermann Ohlsen (Architecture Bremen) acquire.   Today, his picture archive contains around 150,000 photos of automobiles from the 1950s and 1960s as well as the aerospace industry (Henrich Fockes  Focke-Wulf company) in Bremen of the 20s and 30s.

Brief published between 1996 and 2013, the book series "Cars from Bremen" (13 volumes), the history of the Bremen motor vehicle industry (Borgward,  Hanomag,  Mercedes-Benz). in the Delius Klasing Verlag he released the series "Moving Times", which presents various automobiles of the 50s. Short is currently working on a 14-volume Borgward chronicle in his specialty. Kurze is a member of the "F-Kubik" forum for vehicle history.

Works (selection)

As author

Bremen automotive industry 

 Besser fahren, Borgward fahren – Band 1959. Verlag Peter Kurze, Bremen 2010, .
 Besser fahren, Borgward fahren – Band 1958. Verlag Peter Kurze, Bremen 2014, .
 Besser fahren, Borgward fahren – Band 1957. Verlag Peter Kurze, Bremen 2016, .
 Besser fahren, Borgward fahren – Band 1956. Verlag Peter Kurze, Bremen 2018, .
 Borgward Typenkunde. Goliath und Lloyd. Delius Klasing Verlag, Bielefeld 2009, .
 Auf Borgwards Spuren in Hastedt. Verlag Peter Kurze, Bremen 2012, .
 Carl F. W. Borgward Automobilwerke. Verlag Peter Kurze, Bremen 2001, .
 Genau genommen: Borgward P100. Verlag Peter Kurze, Bremen 2012, .
 Prototypen und Kleinserienfahrzeuge der Borgward-, Goliath- und Lloyd-Werke. Verlag Peter Kurze, Bremen 2008, .
 Spurensuche: Autoindustrie Bremen. Verlag Peter Kurze, Bremen 2000, .
 Kurze/Schwerdtfeger: Autoland Bremen. Verlag Peter Kurze, Bremen 2009, .
 Kurze/Neumann: 100 Jahre Automobilbau in Bremen: Die Hansa-Loyd- und Borgward-Ära. Verlag Peter Kurze, Bremen 2006, .
 Kurze/Zwiener: 100 Jahre Automobilbau in Bremen: Die Hanomag- und Mercedes-Benz-Ära. Verlag Peter Kurze, Bremen 2007, .
 Kurze/Kaack/Schwerdtfeger: Wir bauen Autos aus Leidenschaft · 75 Jahre Werk Bremen. Verlag Peter Kurze, Hgb. Daimler AG, Bremen 2014, .

other producers 

 DKW-Meisterklasse. Delius Klasing Verlag, Bielefeld 2005, .
 Ford Taunus 17 M. Delius Klasing Verlag, Bielefeld 2007, .
 Kleinwagen der Fünfzigerjahre. Delius Klasing Verlag, Bielefeld 2008, .
 Mercedes-Benz 190-300 SE. Delius Klasing Verlag, Bielefeld 2006, .
 Kurze/Halwart Schrader: Mercedes-Benz/8 W 114/115. Delius Klasing Verlag, Bielefeld 2012, .
 Kurze/Halwart Schrader: Mercedes-Benz 180/190/219/220a. Delius Klasing Verlag, Bielefeld 2012, .
 Trabant. Delius Klasing Verlag, Bielefeld 2003, .
 Kurze/Halwart Schrader: VW-Bulli. Delius Klasing Verlag, Bielefeld 2010, .
 VW-Käfer. Delius Klasing Verlag, Bielefeld 2003, .
 Wartburg 311/312. Delius Klasing Verlag, Bielefeld 2008, .

Varia 

 Kurze/Stünkel/Ziesemer: Die Geschichte der Luftfahrt in Bremen. Bogenschütz-Verlag, Bremen 1996, .
 Kaack/Kurze: Flugzeuge aus Bremen – Luftfahrtgeschichte der Hansestadt. Sutton, Erfurt 2015, .
 Kaack/Kurze: Industrie in Bremen. Wartberg-Verlag, Gudensberg-Gleichen 2011, .
 Kurze/Steiner: Motorräder aus Zschopau – DKW, IFA, MZ. Delius Klasing Verlag, Bielefeld 1999, .

YouTube 

 Borgward 1956

As a publisherer

Bremen automotive industry 

 Heinrich Völker: Der Weg zur Borgward Isabella. .
 Engelbert Hartwig: Musste Isabella sterben? .
 Harald Focke: Borgwards Hubschrauber. .
 Gunther Riedel: Goliath Sport. .
 Klaus Brandhuber: Borgward Automobil-Werke: Aufbau, Wirtschaftswunder und Konkurs. .
 Heinrich Völker: Silberpfeile aus Bremen. .
 Detlef Lichtenstein: Pietro Frua und seine Autos. .
 Ulrich Knaack: Renault 5. 2006, .
 Wolfgang Simons: Das Umweltauto. .
 Peter Witt: Autos und Motorräder zwischen Eisenach und Moskau. .
 Wolfgang Schröder: AWO, MZ, Trabant und Wartburg. .
 Jörn Fröhlich: AWO, Simson und EMW. .

Varia 

 Henrich Focke: Mein Lebensweg. 1996, .
 Schwärzel/Lehmann: Firmenmuseen in Deutschland. .
 Hartmut Schwerdtfeger/Erik Herlyn: Die Handels-U-Boote „Deutschland“ und „Bremen“. .
 Sven Claußen/Ulf Kaack: Die Seenotkreuzer der DGzRS (Reihe). .
 Enno Hansing: Hier liegen meine Gebeine, ich wollt' es wären Deine. .

References

External links 

 Homepage of Peter Kurze (in German)
 Website of the F-Kubik editor group (in German)

Motoring journalists
1955 births
Living people
20th-century publishers (people)
21st-century publishers (people)